Nukem may refer to:

 Duke Nukem, character in Captain Planet and the Planeteers
 Duke Nukem (character), fictional character and protagonist of the Duke Nukem series
 Nukem Energy, German nuclear fuel company
 Nukem Technologies, German nuclear waste company
 Teddy Joseph Von Nukem (1987–2023), American white nationalist and far-right extremist

See also
 Duke Nukem, American video game series
 Nuke (disambiguation)